Punta Gallinas (Cape Gallinas, "Cape Hens") is a headland in northern Colombia. It is the northernmost point on the mainland of South America, and one of the extreme points of South America.

Geography
Punta Gallinas is situated in the northern part of the department of La Guajira, on the coast of the Caribbean Sea.

History
The area has been populated by the indigenous Wayuu people for a long time.

References

External links
 About the area
 Map of the area

Headlands of Colombia
Geography of La Guajira Department
Caribbean region of Colombia